General Sir Frederick William Hamilton,  (8 July 1815 – 4 October 1890) was a British Army officer who served as Major General commanding the Brigade of Guards from 1868 to 1870.

Early life
Hamilton was born in London in 1815, the son of William Richard Hamilton, a diplomat. He was a Page of Honour for George IV from 1826 to 1830 and to William IV from 1830 to 1831.

Military career
Hamilton was commissioned into the Grenadier Guards in 1831. He commanded his regiment throughout the Eastern campaign of the Crimean War, including the Battle of Alma, the Battle of Balaklava, the Battle of Inkerman (during which he was wounded and had his horse shot out from under him) and the Siege of Sebastopol. He then served as Major General commanding the Brigade of Guards from 1868 to 1870, before retiring with the rank of full general on 1 July 1881.

Hamilton died at Pitcorthie in Fife on 4 October 1890 and was buried at the Parish Churchyard in Kilrenny in Fife. He also served as colonel of the Royal Scots Fusiliers from 1870 until his death.

Family
In 1860 Hamilton married Louisa Anne Erskin Anstruther, daughter of Sir Alexander Anstruther. Hamilton died aged 75 on 4 October 1890 at Pitcorthie House in Colinsburgh, Fife.

References

 

|-

1815 births
1890 deaths
British Army generals
British Army personnel of the Crimean War
Knights Commander of the Order of the Bath
Military personnel from London
Pages of Honour
Grenadier Guards officers